Dilwyn Edward John Harris (22 October 1924 – 30 April 1988) was a Welsh professional rugby league footballer who played in the 1940s and 1950s.

International honours
Harris won four caps for Wales in 1947–1951 while at Castleford.

References

External links
Statistics at thecastlefordtigers.co.uk (archived)

1926 births
1988 deaths
Castleford Tigers players
Rugby league players from Maesteg
Rugby league props
Wales national rugby league team players
Welsh rugby league players